Dixie Classic may refer to:
 Dixie Classic (basketball tournament), a college basketball tournament held in Raleigh, North Carolina from 1949 to 1960
 Dixie Classic (bowl game), a college football bowl game held in Dallas, Texas in 1921, 1924, and 1933
 Dixie Classic Fair, an annual fair held in Winston-Salem, North Carolina since 1882